Shrake may refer to:

People
 Bud Shrake (1931–2009), American journalist
 Gordon Shrake (born 1937), Canadian politician

Other
 Shrake–Rupley algorithm for the accessible surface area